Nolbari railway station is a small railway station in North Garo Hills district, Meghalaya, India. Its code is NOLB. It serves Dudhnoi town. The station consists of a single platform. The platform is not well sheltered. It lacks many facilities including water and sanitation.

Major trains 

 55681/55682 Mendipathar–Guwahati Passenger

References

Railway stations in North Garo Hills district
Rangiya railway division